SS Ossifrage was a Canadian barge that hit a shoal in the Northumberland Strait in 1919, while she was being towed from Wallace, Nova Scotia, Canada to Souris, Prince Edward Island, Canada.

Construction 
Ossifrage was a passenger ship constructed out of wood at the F.W. Wheeler & Co. shipyard in West Bay City, Michigan. She was launched on 11 May 1886.

She had a Triple expansion steam engine driving a single screw propeller and one Scotch boiler. The engine was rated at 540 nhp.

New owner 
She was sold in 1916 to Canadian owners and registered at Halifax, Nova Scotia with registration no. 107488. Where she was later stripped down and her Hulk used as a barge for the fishing industry.

Sinking 
On 29 September 1919, Ossifrage was being towed from Wallace, Nova Scotia, Canada to Souris, Prince Edward Island, Canada when she hit a Shoal in the Northumberland Strait. The ship foundered with no casualties.

References

1886 ships
Ships built in Bay City, Michigan
Steamships of Canada
World War I merchant ships of Canada
Maritime incidents in 1919
Ships sunk with no fatalities